San Juan de Letrán (Italian: Laterno or Laterano; English: Saint John Lateran) may refer to:

Colegio de San Juan de Letran, a Philippine Dominican institution
San Juan de Letrán metro station, a station in Mexico City
Archbasilica of Saint John Lateran, the cathedral church of the Diocese of Rome

See also 
 Lateran